Volegalea is a genus of large sea snails, marine gastropod mollusks in the family Melongenidae, the crown conches and their allies.

Species
Species within the genus Volegalea include:
 Volegalea carnaria (Röding, 1798)
 Volegalea cochlidium (Linnaeus, 1758)
 Volegalea dirki (Nolf, 2007)
Species brought into synonymy
 Volegalea wardiana Iredale, 1938: synonym of Volegalea cochlidium (Linnaeus, 1758)

References

 Landau B. & Vermeij G.J. (2013) A new species of Pugilina (Gastropoda, Caenogastropoda, Melongeninae) from the Lower Miocene Cantaure Formation of Venezuela. Basteria 77(4-6): 89-95.

 
Melongenidae